Domingos Silva Castro (born 22 November 1963 in Fermentões-Guimarães) is a former long-distance runner from Portugal, who was one of the leading athletes in the longer events during the late 1980s, early 1990s. He won the silver medal in the 5,000 metres at the 1987 World Championships.  As a marathoner, he won the 1995 edition of the Paris Marathon, clocking 2:10:06, and the Rotterdam Marathon of 1997, in his personal best of 2:07:51. He won the Cross Internacional de Venta de Baños four times in his career – more than any other athlete. He also came in 2nd place overall in the 1999 New York City Marathon.

At the 1988 Olympic Games, he ran the 5,000m and, as the race unfolded, Kenyan athlete John Ngugi made a substantial leading break. Castro made a brave attempt to chase him and for several laps held on to the silver medal position. In the last lap however, Castro's form started to fade, and in the last 30 metres, West German Dieter Baumann and East German Hansjörg Kunze sprinted past him, taking silver and bronze respectively, robbing a distraught Castro of a reward for his brave run.

His twin brother Dionísio was also a world class athlete in the long-distance events. The two of them represented their native country at the 1988 (Seoul, South Korea) and 1992 Summer Olympics (Barcelona, Spain). Domingos also competed in the 1996 (Atlanta, United States) and 2000 Summer Olympics (Sydney, Australia).

Achievements
All results regarding marathon, unless stated otherwise

References

External links
 
  Centario Sporting

1963 births
Living people
Portuguese male long-distance runners
Portuguese male marathon runners
Athletes (track and field) at the 1988 Summer Olympics
Athletes (track and field) at the 1992 Summer Olympics
Athletes (track and field) at the 1996 Summer Olympics
Athletes (track and field) at the 2000 Summer Olympics
Olympic athletes of Portugal
Portuguese twins
Paris Marathon male winners
Twin sportspeople
World Athletics Championships medalists
Goodwill Games medalists in athletics
Competitors at the 1986 Goodwill Games
Sportspeople from Guimarães